Martina Tichovská is a Czech mountain bike orienteer. She won a bronze medal in the sprint event at the 2008 World MTB Orienteering Championships in Ostróda. At the 2010 World MTB Orienteering Championships in Montalegre she again won a bronze medal in sprint, and a bronze medal with the Czech relay team.

References 

Czech orienteers
Female orienteers
Czech female cyclists
Mountain bike orienteers
Living people
Year of birth missing (living people)